Chester and Cheshire (Constituencies) Act 1542 (34 & 35 Henry VIII c. 13) is the Act of Parliament allowing Cheshire to be represented in the Parliament of England. The county palatine of Chester, ruled by the earls of Chester, was established by William the Conqueror. Cheshire had its own parliament, consisting of barons of the county, and was not represented in the parliament of England. After the passing of the act Cheshire retained some of its special privileges until 1830. The earldom of Chester is traditionally vested in the sovereign's eldest son upon his crowning as Prince of Wales.

The Act was repealed by section 80 of, and Schedule 13 to, the Representation of the People Act 1948 (c.65).

References 

1542 in law
1542 in England
Acts of the Parliament of England (1485–1603)

History of Chester
History of Cheshire
16th century in Cheshire